Mbuvi Gideon Kioko, commonly known as Mike Sonko or simply Sonko (Sheng for "rich person" or "boss"), (born 27 February 1975) is a Kenyan politician.  He served as the  second Governor of Nairobi. He was removed from the office of the governor by a form of impeachement by the Senate of the Republic of Kenya on Abuse of Office, Gross Misconduct and Crimes under National Law on 17 December 2020.

Early life and education 
Mike Mbuvi Sonko was born in Mombasa in 1975. His father, Mzee Kivanguli was Kamba from Mua Hills Machakos County. He attended Kikowani Primary School before proceeding to Kwale High School..

Political career

Makadara Member of Parliament and Nairobi Senator 
Mike Sonko rose to national political prominence when he was elected as a Member of Parliament for Makadara Constituency, Kenya  at the age of 35. The September 20, 2010 by-election was occasioned by a successful petition by Reuben Ndolo.

After the inauguration of the new constitution of Kenya in 2010 and the creation of the county governments, Sonko announced his intention to run for Senator in Nairobi County. He became the First Senator of Nairobi after garnering 808,705 votes, beating his closest competitor, Margaret Wanjiru of the Orange Democratic Movement, who had garnered 525,822 votes, in the Nairobi senatorial election of 2013. Unlike his time in parliament, where he gained notoriety for flaunting House Rules, including incidences of inappropriate dressing, the Senator mostly dressed in official attire.

During his time in the Senate, he formed the Sonko Rescue Team, an officially registered Non-Governmental Organization that provided government-like services to residents of Nairobi slums. The then governor of Nairobi County, Dr. Evans Kidero opposed the activities of the group, citing conflict of interests with the county government's operations. The Senator acquiesced and donated the vehicles to the county government after several weeks of tense public exchanges.

Nairobi Governor 
As early as January 2016, Mike Sonko had announced his intentions to run for Governor of Nairobi County in the 2017 Kenyan general election. After a grueling primary campaign against Peter Kenneth, Sonko ran for the Gubernatorial seat for Nairobi County under the Jubilee Party of Kenya  and defeated the incumbent Evans Kidero to become the second Governor of Nairobi. On 17 December 2020, after undergoing impeachment procedure by the Nairobi County Assembly, Sonko was impeached by the Nairobi Senate and removed from office. Four days after Sonko's removal, Nairobi County Assembly Speaker Benson Mutura was sworn in as acting Nairobi Governor for at least 60 days due to the lack of a deputy governor.

Remarkable event(s) 
After the Westgate shopping mall attack in September 2013, Sonko claimed that he had warned the security services of a possible attack  three months prior to the incident .

Corruption charges 
On the 6th of December 2019, the Director of Public Prosecutions in Kenya issued an arrest warrant against Mike Sonko for various corruption charges during his tenure as a Governor of Nairobi County. He was arrested in Voi. After the arrest, he was detained at Kamiti Maximum Security Prison for a few days and released on December 11, 2019 by anti-corruption court for a bond of sh30 million or a surety of the same amount or a cash bail of Sh15 million
. As a condition for the release, he was barred from accessing office of Nairobi County governor until the case is determined. He was impeached by the senate on 17 December 2020.

Personal life
Sonko is rumoured to have broken out of prison in 1998 and recently, officials have called for him to complete his jail term.

Recognition
In August 2019, Sonko was awarded an honorary degree of excellence from European Digital University (EDU) in recognition for his good will and contribution to the community.

References

External links
 Mike Sonko Documentary

Members of the Senate of Kenya
Members of the National Assembly (Kenya)
Living people
1975 births
Kamba people